WVFB (101.5 FM, "KIX Country") is a radio station broadcasting a country music format. Licensed to Celina, Tennessee, United States, the station is currently owned by Jonathan Keeton, through licensee Frank Keeton Aircasters, Inc.

References

External links
 

Country radio stations in the United States
VFB
Clay County, Tennessee